Melodie Crittenden (born 1968) is an American country and Christian music artist. Her first album was recorded at the age of nine in Norman, Oklahoma, and was titled Melodie Sings.  She traveled around Oklahoma with her family band "The Crittendens", performing at crusade events with evangelist Larry Jones (founder of the "Feed The Children" charity).  Later in life, she recorded a self-titled debut album for Asylum/Elektra Records in 1998, the same year that she charted with her rendition of "Bless the Broken Road" (her version was titled simply "Broken Road"); she would later record the song a second time as a member of the gospel group Selah.

Crittenden has released two studio albums, starting with her self-titled debut in 1998. A third album, entitled The Woman I Am, was slated for release around 2004 but was never released.

As of 2016, Crittenden is a member of the Eagles tribute band Eaglemaniacs, which also includes Ron Hemby, formerly of The Buffalo Club.

Discography

Albums

Singles

Guest singles

Music videos

References

External links
 Melodie Crittenden on Myspace

1969 births
Living people
People from Shawnee, Oklahoma
American women country singers
American country singer-songwriters
Country musicians from Oklahoma
American performers of Christian music
Asylum Records artists
Singer-songwriters from Oklahoma
21st-century American women singers
21st-century American singers